Singapore participated at the 2010 Asian Para Games—First Asian Para Games in Guangzhou, China from 13 to 19 December 2010. Athletes from Singapore achieved four bronze medals only. The Chef-de-Mission of the delegation was Mr. Henry Tan.

Medalists

References

2010 in Singaporean sport
Nations at the 2010 Asian Para Games